Ellis Edgar Achong  (16 February 1904 – 29 August 1986) was a sportsman from Trinidad and Tobago in the West Indies. He played cricket for the West Indies and was the first person of known Chinese descent to play in a Test match. Left-arm unorthodox spin (left-arm wrist spin) was sometimes known as "slow left-arm chinaman" and thought to be named after Achong's bowling style.

Achong was born in Belmont, Port of Spain. He played football as a left-winger for a local team, Maple, in the 1920s and 1930s, and represented Trinidad and Tobago from 1919 to 1932.

Achong is better known for playing cricket. He was mainly a bowler. His stock ball was left-arm orthodox spin (left-arm finger spin), but one of his variations was unorthodox left-arm spin. After bowling this variation to have Walter Robins stumped at Old Trafford in 1933, it is reputed that Robins said to the umpire, Joe Hardstaff Sr., "fancy being done by a bloody Chinaman". Learie Constantine is said to have replied: "Do you mean the bowler or the ball?"  An unorthodox left-arm spin delivery (spinning from the off side to the leg side for a right-handed batsman) was sometimes known as a "chinaman" delivery as a result, although the term is now rarely used. However, Achong was not the earliest recorded Test match player to bowl unorthodox left-arm spin – that is believed to be Charles Llewellyn of South Africa.

Achong played in six Test matches for the West Indies against the English cricket team from 1930 to 1935, three in the West Indies and three in the 1933 tour of England. In all, Achong took eight Test wickets at a bowling average of 47.25, but his Test figures belie his much greater success at regional level in the West Indies between 1929–30 and 1934–35. In the final of the Inter-Colonial Tournament of 1931–32, he took 3 for 74 and 7 for 73 to bowl Trinidad to victory over British Guiana.

He married during the 1933 tour of England and settled in Manchester. After his last Test match, he continued to play cricket for several clubs in the Lancashire Leagues until 1951, taking more than 1,000 wickets, including 10 in an innings for Burnley against Todmorden in 1945.

He returned to Trinidad and Tobago in 1952, and stood as a Test umpire in the 4th Test between West Indies and England at Port of Spain in March 1954, a high-scoring draw in which West Indies scored an imposing 681 for 8 declared, with the 3 "W"s (Everton Weekes, Frank Worrell and Clyde Walcott) all scoring centuries in West Indies' first innings, and Peter May and Denis Compton doing the same in England's 537 in reply.

Achong later became a sports coach with the Trinidad and Tobago Ministry of Education, coaching and selecting the Trinidad and Tobago cricket team. He died aged 82 in St. Augustine.

References

External links

Cricinfo – The Original Chinaman
Best of Trinidad and Tobago

1904 births
1986 deaths
Trinidad and Tobago cricket umpires
Trinidad and Tobago people of Chinese descent
Trinidad and Tobago cricketers
Trinidad and Tobago footballers
West Indies Test cricketers
Cricketers from Port of Spain
Trinidad and Tobago cricket coaches
West Indian Test cricket umpires
Hakka sportspeople
Sportspeople of Chinese descent
Association football wingers